Avargan or Owregan or Avergan or Urgan may refer to:
 Avargan, Chaharmahal and Bakhtiari
 Avargan, East Azerbaijan
 Owregan, Isfahan